Paul Laszlo Harsanyi (born December 30, 1974) is an American former professional tennis player.

Harsanyi, who is of Hungarian descent, grew up in Potomac, Maryland and attended Churchill High School.

From 1993 to 1997, Harsanyi played varsity tennis for the University of North Carolina, where as a freshman he was named ACC Rookie of the Year in 1994.

While competing on the professional tour after college he made three ATP Tour main draw appearances at the Legg Mason Tennis Classic in Washington D.C.

References

External links
 
 

1974 births
Living people
American male tennis players
North Carolina Tar Heels men's tennis players
Tennis people from Maryland
American people of Hungarian descent